Private David Edwards (1841 – April 14, 1897) was an American soldier who fought in the American Civil War. Edwards received the country's highest award for bravery during combat, the Medal of Honor, for his action during the Battle of Five Forks in Virginia on 1 April 1865. He was honored with the award on 10 May 1865.

Biography
Edwards was born in Wales in 1841. He joined the 146th New York Infantry in September 1862, and mustered out with his regiment in July 1865. He died on 14 April 1897 and his remains are interred at the Waterville Cemetery in Waterville, New York.

Medal of Honor citation

See also

List of American Civil War Medal of Honor recipients: A–F

References

1841 births
1897 deaths
Welsh-born Medal of Honor recipients
People of New York (state) in the American Civil War
Union Army officers
United States Army Medal of Honor recipients
Welsh emigrants to the United States
American Civil War recipients of the Medal of Honor